Thomas "Tommy" Ricketts VC (April 15, 1901 – February 10, 1967) was a Newfoundland soldier and recipient of the Victoria Cross, the highest and most prestigious award for gallantry in the face of the enemy that can be awarded to British and Commonwealth forces.  Ricketts is the youngest army recipient fighting in a combatant role.

Victoria Cross
Ricketts, who was 17 years old and a private in the 1st Battalion, Royal Newfoundland Regiment during the First World War, was cited in the London Gazette for his actions on October 14, 1918.

King George V presented Ricketts with his VC at York Cottage on the Sandringham Estate on January 19, 1919.  At the ceremony, the King reportedly stated: "This is the youngest VC in my army."  General Dighton Probyn, one of the oldest living VC holders at the time, was also present at the investiture.

While Ricketts is the youngest VC army recipient in a combatant role, he is not the youngest VC recipient.  Hospital Apprentice Andrew Fitzgibbon and Drummer Thomas Flinn (who despite strictly being a non-combatant, received his VC for hand-to-hand combat during the Indian Mutiny), both aged 15, were awarded the VC in non-combatant roles.  While Ricketts, Fitzgibbon and Flinn were all living VC recipients, Jack Cornwell of the Royal Navy was awarded the VC posthumously for his actions at the Battle of Jutland at age 16.

Ricketts was also awarded France's Croix de Guerre with Golden Star in 1919.

After the war

After the war, Ricketts studied pharmacy, and opened a business on Water Street in St. John's. He was the youngest living VC recipient from the time of his award until 1940.

Ricketts was given a state funeral when he died in 1967, and is commemorated by a memorial on the former site of his pharmacy.  Ricketts is buried at the Anglican Cemetery, Forest Road, St. John's, Newfoundland and Labrador, Canada. Ricketts' medals are on display at The Rooms in St. John's, Newfoundland and Labrador.
 
Ricketts is sometimes erroneously referred to as having been a Canadian soldier during the First World War.  Newfoundland was a self-governing dominion at the time and did not become a province of Canada until 1949.

The sports arena in Baie Verte is named in honour of Ricketts. In 2018, the "Tommy Ricketts Memorial Peace Park" opened in Conception Bay South.

References

External links

Newfoundland's Reluctant War Hero: Thomas Ricketts V.C., C.de G.
Includes letters about Ricketts and a portrait
Burial location of Thomas Ricketts "Newfoundland"
News item "Thomas Ricketts' Victoria Cross donated to the Canadian War Museum"
Legion Magazine article on Thomas Ricketts
 

1901 births
1967 deaths
Canadian military personnel from Newfoundland and Labrador
Canadian military personnel of World War I
Newfoundland World War I recipients of the Victoria Cross
Newfoundland military personnel of World War I
Recipients of the Croix de Guerre 1914–1918 (France)
People from Newfoundland (island)
Bishop Feild School alumni
Child soldiers in World War I
Royal Newfoundland Regiment soldiers
Royal Newfoundland Regiment